John Henry Hargreaves (1839 - 19 January 1907) was a member of the Queensland Legislative Assembly.

Biography
Hargreaves was born in Gravesend, Kent, the son of John Henry Hargreaves Snr. and his wife Charlotte (née Furner). He arrived in Queensland for a goldfields expedition and then established a timber and building business in Cooktown around 1878.

On 26 April 1875 he married Mahala Gee (died 1905) in Townsville and together had four sons and three daughters. He drowned on the government-owned ketch, the Pilot, which went missing during the 1907 Cooktown cyclone. His body was not recovered but a memorial to him is at the Cooktown Cemetery.

Public career
At the 1904 Queensland state election, Hargreaves won the seat of Cook for the Ministerialists, defeating the Labour candidate, Mr Le Vaux by two votes. As it was only four months before the 1907 Queensland state election when he died, no by-election was held.

Hargreaves had previously been a councilor on the Shire of Cook and was its Mayor from 1901 until 1904.

References

Members of the Queensland Legislative Assembly
1839 births
1907 deaths
Deaths by drowning in Australia
19th-century Australian politicians